Marta sui Tubi is an Italian indie rock band formed in 2002.

They debuted in 2003 with the album Muscoli e dei and participated at the Sanremo Music Festival 2013 with the songs "Vorrei" and "Dispari".

Discography

Studio albums

Compilations

References 

Musical groups established in 2002
Italian rock music groups